Regev Fanan (born 23 November 1981) is a former Israeli professional basketball player who is currently the athletic trainer for Maccabi Tel Aviv. Fanan played most of his professional career with Maccabi, and also played for Hapoel Galil Elyon and Ironi Ramat Gan. He is the son of Moni Fanan.

Honours

 FIBA SuproLeague Champion 2001
 Euroleague Champion 2005
 Israeli Basketball Super League Champion 2001, 2002, 2005, 2006, 2007
 Israeli Basketball State Cup Champion 2001, 2002, 2005, 2006

References

1981 births
Living people
Hapoel Galil Elyon players
Ironi Ramat Gan players
Israeli men's basketball players
Israeli Basketball Premier League players
Maccabi Tel Aviv B.C. players
Guards (basketball)